Duruca can refer to the following villages in Turkey:

 Duruca, Amasya
 Duruca, Karayazı
 Duruca, Taşköprü